Dilles Bottom is an unincorporated community in Belmont County, in the U.S. state of Ohio.

History
A post office called Dilles Bottom was established in 1827, and remained in operation until 1940. The Dille family settled here on the "bottoms" in the 1790s.

References

Unincorporated communities in Belmont County, Ohio
1827 establishments in Ohio
Populated places established in 1827
Unincorporated communities in Ohio